Binnhill Tower is a stone-built tower in the Gothic style, located in Kinfauns, Perth and Kinross, Scotland. It was designed in 1839 by local architect William Mackenzie, to an order by Francis Gray, 14th Lord Gray.

The tower became roofless and was vandalised in the late 20th century. It was placed on the Buildings at Risk Register for Scotland in 1997. Put on the market in 2015, with an asking price of £28,000, it sold in September of that year. It was listed for sale again, in March 2022, when it was noted that it had lapsed planning permission to be restored.

Gallery

References

External links
"Binn Hill Tower Whats At The Top ?" – Valhall, YouTube, 28 September 2017

Towers in Scotland
1839 establishments in Scotland
Category B listed buildings in Perth and Kinross